Hopkins United Methodist Church, is a historic African American Church located at 13250 Highland Rd in Highland, Maryland.

The building was constructed in 1882. Operated as the Hopkins Chapel Colored School by order of the Howard County Public School board on December 5, 1883.

See also
Asbury Methodist Episcopal Church (Annapolis Junction, Maryland)
Brown Chapel United Methodist Church
First Baptist Church of Elkridge
Locust United Methodist Church
Mt. Moriah Lodge No. 7
St. Stephens African Methodist Episcopal Church

References

African-American history of Howard County, Maryland
Howard County, Maryland landmarks
Highland, Maryland
Churches completed in 1882
1882 establishments in Maryland